Green-sensitive opsin is a protein that in humans is encoded by the OPN1MW gene.
OPN1MW2 is a similar opsin.

See also
 Opsin

References

Further reading

External links
  GeneReviews/NIH/NCBI/UW entry on Red-Green Color Vision Defects

G protein-coupled receptors
Color vision